A Very Good Young Man is a lost 1919 American silent comedy film directed by Donald Crisp, written by Martin Brown, Robert Housum, and Walter Woods, and starring Bryant Washburn, Helene Chadwick, Julia Faye, Sylvia Ashton, Jane Wolfe, Helen Jerome Eddy, and Wade Boteler. It was released on July 6, 1919, by Paramount Pictures.

Plot
As described in a film magazine, LeRoy Sylvester (Washburn), a very good young man, is engaged to Ruth Douglas (Chadwick), whose well meaning sister Kitty (Faye) points out to her the fact that no young man so exemplary in his habits before marriage can be humanly expected to continue his model behavior after it. Ruth informs Leroy of his unsuspected shortcoming and he sets out to prove he is a villain of the deepest dye. Osprey Bacchus (Eddy), the dowdy daughter of a lady undertaker, is pressed into service as his companion on his first wild evening. He seeks to bring himself into proper disrepute by flirting with a fascinating lady met at the roof garden, posing as the thief who stole some valuable jewels that have disappeared, resisting an officer, and other escapades, but all in vain. Circumstance saves him despite his best efforts, and Ruth finally consents to marry him despite his lily white reputation.

Cast
 Bryant Washburn as LeRoy Sylvester
 Helene Chadwick as Ruth Douglas
 Julia Faye as Kitty Douglas
 Sylvia Ashton as Mrs. Douglas
 Jane Wolfe as Mrs. Mandelharper
 Helen Jerome Eddy as Osprey Bacchus
 Wade Boteler as Tom Hurley
 Anna Q. Nilsson as Viva Bacchus
 Noah Beery, Sr. as Blood
 Edmund Burns as Adrian Love
 Mayme Kelso as Mrs. Love
 Charles West

References

External links 

 
 
 Film stills at silenthollywood.com

1919 films
1910s English-language films
Silent American comedy films
1919 comedy films
Paramount Pictures films
Lost American films
Films directed by Donald Crisp
American black-and-white films
American silent feature films
1919 lost films
Lost comedy films
1910s American films